Thomas Roland Kingsford (September 27, 1928 – October 29, 2005) was an American football player and coach. He served as the head football coach at Southern Utah University from 1967 to 1977, compiling a record of 51–51. An accomplished quarterback at the University of Montana, Kingsford was selected by the San Francisco 49ers in the 1951 NFL Draft but had his playing career put on hold to serve in the Korean War.

Head coaching record

College

References

External links
 

1928 births
2005 deaths
American football quarterbacks
Montana Grizzlies football coaches
Montana Grizzlies football players
Southern Utah Thunderbirds football coaches
High school football coaches in Montana
American military personnel of the Korean War
People from Missoula, Montana
Players of American football from Montana